Czinger Vehicles Inc., commonly known as Czinger is an American automobile manufacturer of hybrid sports cars based in Los Angeles, California, operating since 2019.

History 
In 2019, American entrepreneur Kevin Czinger founded the company along with his son, Lukas Czinger. Czinger Vehicles is headquartered in Los Angeles, and designs and manufactures supercars. The first vehicle developed and constructed by the company was the 21C. The 21C is scheduled to enter production in 2023. The 21C is notable for its performance, and use of generative design and additive manufacturing. The 21C is planned to be a limited run of 80 vehicles. Czinger Vehicles is represented by a global network of luxury automotive dealers including O'Gara Coach in California and H.R. Owen in London, UK.

Vehicles 
21C

References

External links 
 Official website

Car manufacturers of the United States
American companies established in 2019
Vehicle manufacturing companies established in 2019
Motor vehicle manufacturers based in California
Manufacturing companies based in Los Angeles
2019 establishments in California